Fudbalski klub Mornar is a Montenegrin professional football club, based in the coastal town of Bar. They currently compete in the Montenegrin First League.

History
FK Mornar (FC Sailor) was founded in December 1923, as JSK Crnojević. In period until 1941, since the 1924–25 season, the club played for a few seasons in the Montenegrin football championship (former Zeta Banovina), but without any significant success.
From 1945, the club participated under several names - Jadran, Obnova and Tempo. First significant success the club made in the 1950 season with promotion to the Montenegrin Republic League.From 1950 to 2006, Mornar played numerous seasons in the Republic League and won three titles (1989, 1995, 2001). In the 1994–95 season, FK Mornar made "double" on Republic level, by winning both titles - in the Montenegrin Republic League, and the Montenegrin Republic Cup.
For the first time, Mornar played in Yugoslav leagues in the 1989–90 season, as a member of the Yugoslav Third Inter-Republic League - West. In the 1995-96 season, Mornar debuted in the Yugoslav Second League, where they spent six seasons until 2006.
Historical success Mornar made in summer 2009, with their first promotion to the Montenegrin First League. Until now, the club from Bar played seven seasons in the highest league competition in Montenegro, but without any significant result. On 2018-19 Montenegrin First League, Mornar made an Prva CFL all-time negative record, as they earned only 12 points on 36 games, but with only one single victory during the whole campaign. That year, team from Bar suffered 12 defeats in a row, which is the longest losing streak in the history of Montenegrin top-tier.

First League Record

For the first time, Mornar played in the Montenegrin First League in the 2009–10 season. Below is a list of FK Mornar scores in the First League by every single season.

Honours and achievements
 Montenegrin Second League – 2
winners (2): 2017–18, 2020–21
runners-up (1): 2011–12
 Montenegrin Republic League – 3
winners (3): 1988–89, 1994–95, 2000–01
 Montenegrin Republic Cup – 1
winners (1): 1994–95

Players

Current squad

Notable players
For the list of former and current players with Wikipedia article, please see :Category:FK Mornar players.
Below is the list of most-known players which, during their career, played for FK Mornar.
 Slobodan Marović
 Nikola Žigić
 Mitar Novaković
 Srđan Radonjić
 Zoran Banović

Historical list of coaches

 Ratko Stevović (Jun 2006 - Jun 2007)
 Mladen Vukićević (Jun 2008 - Jan 2010)
 Brajan Nenezić (5 Jan 2010 - Jun 2010)
 Dušan Jevrić (Jul 2010 - Sep 2010)
 Boris Ljutica (29 Sep 2010 - Aug 2011)
 Obren Sarić (22 Aug 2011 - Sep 2012)
 Zoran Pešić (Sep 2012)
 Saša Petrović (30 Sep 2012 - Apr 2013)
 Obren Sarić (24 Apr 2013 - Jun 2014)
 Mladen Vukićević (Jul 2014 - Jun 2015)
 Rudolf Marčić (Jul 2015 - Mar 2016)
 Zoran Mijović (25 Mar 2016 - Jun 2017)
 Rade Vešović (15 Sep 2017 - Jun 2018)
 Aleksandar Madžar (9 Jul 2018 - Sep 2018)
 Goran Milojević (6 Sep 2018 - Feb 2019)
 Igor Raičević (Feb 2019 - June 2019)
 Derviš Hadžiosmanović (Feb 2019 )
 Obren Šarić (Jul 2019 - Oct 2020)
 Slavoljub Bubanja (Nov 2020 - Nov 2021)
 Andrija Delibašić (Nov 2021  -

Stadium

FK Mornar plays its home games at Stadion Topolica, whose capacity is 2,500 seats. The stadium is built at the coast of Adriatic Sea, near the city beach and the Port of Bar. The stadium has floodlights, and except football, it's the main athletic field in Montenegro.

See also
Stadion Topolica
Bar
Montenegrin Second League
Montenegrin clubs in Yugoslav football competitions (1946–2006)

References

External links
FK Mornar
Profile by Football Association of Montenegro
Profile by Weltfussballarchiv   

 
Football clubs in Montenegro
Association football clubs established in 1923
1923 establishments in Montenegro
FK Mornar